Gibel is a surname. Notable people with the surname include:

Christy McGinity Gibel (born 1977), American actress and reality star
Henry Gibel (1858–1906), Swiss-born American architect
Katya Gibel Mevorach (born 1952), American academic